Anilopam (INN; PR 786-723) is an opioid analgesic of the benzazepine class which was developed by Pentwell in the 1960s but was never marketed.

References 

Analgesics
Anilines
Benzazepanes
Opioids
Methoxy compounds